Bruce Hood may refer to:

Bruce Hood (ice hockey) (1936–2018), Canadian ice hockey referee
Bruce Hood (psychologist), British experimental psychologist